Raúl José Mejía González (born 4 April 1954) is a Mexican politician affiliated with the Institutional Revolutionary Party. As of 2014 he served as Senator of the LX and LXI Legislatures of the Mexican Congress representing Nayarit. He also served as Deputy during the  LIX Legislature.

References

1954 births
Living people
Politicians from Tepic, Nayarit
Members of the Senate of the Republic (Mexico)
Members of the Chamber of Deputies (Mexico)
Institutional Revolutionary Party politicians
20th-century Mexican politicians
21st-century Mexican politicians
University of Guadalajara alumni
Academic staff of the University of Guadalajara
Municipal presidents of Tepic